Rarefying osteitis is a general term for a radiolucent lesion on a radiograph usually diagnosed as a periapical abscess or a periapical cyst.

References

Radiography
Pathology of the maxilla and mandible